.ax is the Internet country code top-level domain (ccTLD) of Åland, Finland, introduced in 2006. Previously, most Åland websites were under the .aland.fi subdomain.

History
On February 17, 2006, the Finnish parliament approved a modification of the laws regulating Finnish domain names to include the .ax top-level domain. During a three-year period, the aland.fi subdomain was phased out while .ax was used in parallel; no new registrations under the aland.fi subdomain were to be accepted, and all owners of domains under the aland.fi subdomain would receive registrations for the corresponding .ax domain.

On March 17, 2006, Finnish president Tarja Halonen signed the bill into law, effective as of March 27, 2006. The government of Åland began accepting registrations immediately following the changing of the law.

On June 9, 2006, ICANN approved delegating the .ax top-level domain to the government of Åland. The .ax domain was added to the root zone on June 21, 2006, and became active on August 15, 2006. The code ax itself comes from the ISO 3166 standard, and was assigned to Åland in 2004. The letter X is not included in any major or locally used language, but other possible codes were already taken, e.g. .al by Albania, .ad by Andorra, and .an by what was at the time the Netherlands Antilles.

Since September 5, 2016, anyone worldwide is permitted to register domain names under the .ax TLD.

References

  Adopted Resolutions, special meeting of the board of ICANN

External links
 IANA .ax whois information
 .ax domain whois

Communications in Åland
Mass media in Åland
Country code top-level domains
Communications in Finland